Vet Volunteers, previously published as Wild at Heart, is a series of children's books written by New York Times author Laurie Halse Anderson.

The series takes place at the Wild at Heart Animal Clinic run by Dr. J. J. Mac, otherwise known as Dr. Mac. It follows the adventures of five children who volunteer at the clinic and solve mysteries as they help the animals there.

Books in the series
Fight for Life: Maggie (2007)
Homeless: Sunita (2007)
Trickster: David (2008)
Manatee Blues: Brenna (2008)
Say Good-Bye: Zoe (2008)
Storm Rescue: Sunita (2008)
Teacher's Pet: Maggie (2009)
Trapped: Brenna (2009)
Fear of Falling: David (2009)
Time to Fly: Zoe (2009)
Masks: Sunita (2012)
End of the Race: Maggie (2012)
New Beginnings: Jules and Josh (2012)
Acting Out: Zoe (2012)
Helping Hands: Jules and Josh (2013)
Treading Water: Brenna (2014)

References
 http://madwomanintheforest.com/youngreaders-vet-volunteers/

External links
 
 Vet Volunteers on Myspace 
 

Series of children's books
American children's novels
Children's mystery novels
Children's novels about animals
2000s children's books
2010s children's books